Dionigi Strocchi (6 January 1762, Faenza - 15 April 1850, Ravenna) was an Italian educator, writer, classical scholar and translator.

Life
After studying in a seminary, he moved to Rome in 1783, where he later graduated in jurisprudence. In 1790 he found a job in the Secretariat of Latin Letters in the Holy College. He then returned to his birthplace at the end of the 18th century to support the Cisalpine Republic and its successor the Napoleonic Kingdom of Italy, gaining important jobs in both administrations;. Between 1806 and 1809 he was rector and eloquence lecturer at the Evangelista Torricelli state gymnasium in the city.

He was a friend of Vincenzo Monti, Ugo Foscolo, Paolo Costa, Giovanni Paradisi and Ennio Quirino Visconti and established the neoclassical literary school in Faenza. When the Napoleonic regime fell he returned to the Papal States, taking refuge in San Marino and briefly imprisoned in Bologna. He did not oppose the Restoration and composed a hymn in honour pope Pius IX and his election in 1846. Pius made him a senator in 1848, two years before his death.

He wrote his own poems but is better known as a translator, particularly for his metrical translation of Callimachus's hymns in 1805, which Giosuè Carducci adjudged to be finer than the originals. He also produced metrical translations of Virgil's Georgics in 1831 and his Eclogues in 1834. At the time of his death he was working on a version of Louis I of Bavaria's poems - this was published posthumously in 1856, including two previously published translations of 1836 and 1844.

Works

Biographies
 De vita Alexandri Albani cardinalis, Romæ, in typographeo Paleariniano, 1790.

Poems and hymns
 Versi del cavaliere Dionigi Strocchi, Bologna, Tipografia Nobili, 1820.
 Poesie e prose italiane e latine del cav. Dionigi Strocchi faentino, 2 voll., Faenza, Montanari e Marabini, 1830.
 Raccolta di versi in vario metro italiani e latino del ch. cav. Dionigi Strocchi, Ravenna, Tipografia del ven. Seminario arciv., 1845.
 Inno a Pio nono, Faenza, per Pietro Conti all'Apollo, 1847.

Scholarship and letters
 Discorsi accademici del cav. Dionigi Strocchi faentino, Ravenna, presso A. Roveri e figli, 1836.
  Elogi e discorsi accademici del cavaliere Dionigi Strocchi faentino, Parma, Pietro Fiaccadori, 1840. (Google Books)
 Lettere edite e inedite del cavaliere Dionigi Strocchi ed altre inedite a lui scritte da uomini illustri raccolte e annotate a cura di Giovanni Ghinassi, 2 voll., Faenza, Conti, 1868 (Second volume on Google Books)

Classical translations 
 Inni a Venere tradotti dal greco dall'abate Dionigi Strocchi, Firenze, per Gaetano Cambiagi stampatore reale, 1790.
 Callimaco, Inni recati in rima da Dionigi Strocchi faentino, Milano, dalla tipografia di Francesco Sonzogno di Gio. Batt. stampatore librajo, 1805.
 Virgil, Le Georgiche volgarizzate da Dionigi Strocchi, Prato, presso i fratelli Giachetti, 1831.
 Virgil, La prima egloga volgarizzata dal cav. Dionigi Strocchi, Milano. Tipografia Fontana, 1832.
 Virgil, Le Buccoliche volgarizzate da Dionigi Strocchi, Pesaro, pei tipi di Annesio Nobili, 1834.
 Poesie greche e latine volgarizzate dal cavaliere Dionigi Strocchi faentino, Faenza, Conti, 1843; Nuova edizione, Torino, Res, 1995. .

German translations
 Louis I of Bavaria, Poesie di S. M. re di Baviera recate in metro italiano dal cavaliere Dionigi Strocchi, Faenza, presso Pietro Conti all'Apollo, 1836 (translation attempt).
 Louis I of Bavaria, Poesie di S. M. Lodovico re di Baviera recate in metro italiano dal cavaliere Dionigi Strocchi, Fano, Tip. Lana, 1844 (translation attempt). 
 Louis I of Bavaria, Poesie di Lodovico re di Baviera recate in versi italiani dal cav. Dionigi Strocchi, ora per la prima volta date in luce per cura di Giovanni Ghinassi, Prato, per Ranieri Guasti, 1856 (original complete edition, published posthumously).

References

1762 births
1850 deaths
People from Faenza
18th-century Italian writers
18th-century Italian male writers
19th-century Italian writers
18th-century Italian poets
19th-century Italian poets
19th-century Italian male writers
Latin–Italian translators
German–Italian translators
Greek–Italian translators
Italian classical scholars
19th-century translators
Translators of Virgil